Acaciaville  is a community in the Canadian province of Nova Scotia, located in the  Municipality of the District of Digby in Digby County.

References

 Acaciaville  on Destination Nova Scotia

Communities in Digby County, Nova Scotia